The 1986–87 New Jersey Nets season was the Nets' 11th season in the NBA.

Draft picks

Roster

Regular season

Season standings

Record vs. opponents

Game log

Player statistics

Season

Awards and records

Transactions

References

See also
 1986–87 NBA season

New Jersey Nets season
New Jersey Nets seasons
New Jersey Nets
New Jersey Nets
20th century in East Rutherford, New Jersey
Meadowlands Sports Complex